Serrin is a surname. Notable people with the surname include:

 James Serrin (1926–2012), American mathematician
 Meyers–Serrin theorem
 William Serrin (1939–2018), American journalist

See also
 Serin (name)